A Notice of Proposed Rulemaking (NPRM) is a public notice that is issued by law when an independent agency of the US government wishes to add, remove, or change a rule or regulation as part of the rulemaking process. The notice is an important part of US administrative law, which facilitates government by typically creating a process of taking of public comment. The term is also used at the state level in the United States.

Procedure
Although it is not required by the US Constitution, NPRM is required and defined by the Administrative Procedure Act, section 553. The US Congress created the requirement to enlighten agencies and to force them to listen to comments and concerns of people who will likely be affected by the regulation. The Federal Aviation Administration (FAA), Federal Communications Commission (FCC), National Telecommunications and Information Administration (NTIA), and Environmental Protection Agency (EPA) are examples of agencies subject to the NPRM.

The NPRM is published in the Federal Register and typically gives 60 days for public comment from any interested party and an additional 30 days for reply comments. Original comments may still be filed in the reply comments window. While that is the normal method of agency rulemaking, emergency rulemaking may bypass the NPRM process. A notice is not required to be published in the Federal Register if all persons subject to it are named and personally served with a copy of it.

Each notice, whether published in the Federal Register or personally served, includes:
A statement of the time, place, and nature of the proposed rulemaking proceeding;
A reference to the authority under which it is issued;
A description of the subjects and issues involved or the substance and terms of the proposed regulation;
A statement of the time within which written comments must be submitted; and
A statement of how and to what extent interested persons may participate in the proceeding.

NPRMs are often preceded by a notice of inquiry (NOI) in which comments are invited but no rules have yet been proposed. Comments received in that period allow the agency to prepare the NPRM better by making more-informed decisions on proposals. An NPRM may be followed by a further notice of proposed rulemaking (FNPRM), if the comments from the initial NPRM lead the agency to change the proposal drastically to the point that further comment is required. Rules are finalized when a report and order (R&O) is issued, which may be amended with a second R&O (or more) in a continuing proceeding (such as the DTV transition).

Regulations.gov is a website established in 2002 to provide better access to rulemaking and allows comments to be posted to nearly 300 federal agencies.

Foreign equivalents
Equivalent procedures of public consultation are also used outside the United States for a document giving public notice of a proposed rule change and inviting informed comment on it. The European Aviation Safety Agency (EASA) publishes similar notices referred to a notice of proposed amendment when it seeks public comment.

See also
Request for Comments (RFC) in Internet governance.

References

United States administrative law